Diving for Pearls is an Australian play by Katherine Thomson set against the background of the economic rationalism of the 1980s, in Port Kembla. It became one of the most popular Australian plays of the 1990s.

References

External links
"Playing the 20th century – episode eight: Diving for Pearls", Radio National, 6 February 2011
Diving for Pearls at AusStage

Australian plays
1991 plays